The 1928–29 İstanbul Football League season was the 21st season of the league. Galatasaray SK won the league for the 10th time.

Season

References

Istanbul Football League seasons
Turkey
Istanbul